The Marion Female Seminary, also known as the Old Perry County High School, is a historic Greek Revival-style school building utilizing the Doric order in Marion, Alabama.  It was listed on the National Register of Historic Places on October 4, 1973.

History
The Marion Female Seminary was established in 1836, with this building completed in 1850.  The building contained the studio of artist Nicola Marschall when he taught at the school.  He taught painting, music, French, and German while employed here.   He is credited with designing the first Confederate flag.  He also designed the gray Confederate military uniform, influenced by the mid-1800s uniforms of the Austrian and French Armies.

Built to serve as a female seminary from the time of construction, it was subsequently owned by the city of Marion from 1918 to 1930, at which time it was transferred to state ownership for use as a Perry County public school.  Originally a three-story building, it was remodeled in 1930 with the removal of the uppermost floor from the building.

It currently houses the Perry County Historical Society and the Perry County High School Alumni Association.

See also
National Register of Historic Places listings in Perry County, Alabama
Women in education in the United States
Historical Marker Database

References

National Register of Historic Places in Perry County, Alabama
Female seminaries in the United States
Defunct private universities and colleges in Alabama
Marion, Alabama
Education in Perry County, Alabama
Educational institutions established in 1836
History of women in Alabama